This article lists all power stations in Mozambique.

Hydroelectric

Thermal

Solar
Partial list of solar power stations in Mozambique.

See also 
 List of power stations in Africa
 List of largest power stations in the world

References 

Mozambique
 
Power stations